Farhad Salafzoon (born ) is an Iranian male volleyball player. With his club Saipa he competed at the 2013 FIVB Volleyball Men's Club World Championship.

Sporting achievements

National team
2017  World Grand Champions Cup 
2015  Asian Men's Championship
2010  Asian U20 Championship
2009  World U19 Championship
2008  Asian U21 Championship
2008  Asian U18 Championship
2007  World U19 Championship
2007  Asian U19 Championship

Club 
2015  Asian Men's Club Championship with Paykan Tehran

Individual
2008: Asian U20 Championship – Best Setter 
2008: Asian U18 Championship – Most Valuable Player

References

External links
Farhad Salafzoon profile at FIVB.org

Farhad Salafzoon on WorldofValley's database

1992 births
Iranian men's volleyball players
Living people
Place of birth missing (living people)
Iranian expatriate sportspeople in Greece